Mads Beierholm (born 15 November 1984) is a Danish former professional footballer whoHe played as a midfielder.

He held the record as the youngest goalscorer in Danish Superliga history, until Roony Bardghji beat that in November 2021.

Career

Club career
Beierholm has played in the Danish Superliga for Vejle Boldklub and SønderjyskE, and has also played in Iceland for Fylkir.

International career
Beierholm represented Denmark at youth level from under-16 to under-20.

References

1984 births
Living people
Danish men's footballers
Vejle Boldklub players
SønderjyskE Fodbold players
Mads Beierholm
Odder IGF players
Association football midfielders
People from Vejle Municipality
Sportspeople from the Region of Southern Denmark